The discography of Antique, a Swedish-Greek laïko and Eurodance musical duo, consists of three studio albums, two hybrid albums, two extended plays (EP), three compilation albums, nine singles, four promotional singles, and 12 music videos and 50 recorded songs. In 1999 Helena Paparizou and Nikos Panagiotidis, two Swedes born to Greek immigrant parents, recorded a demo of the Notis Sfakianakis hit "Opa Opa", leading to the formation of Antique and a contract with the newly formed Swedish indie label Bonnier Music. "Opa Opa" was released as a single in August. Becoming popular with the diaspora initially, it became a top ten hit across Scandinavia, while also charting in Romania, Germany, and Switzerland. It was the first Greek-language song to reach the Swedish top five and was certified platinum and Antique were the first act to be nominated at the Grammis with a Greek-language song. The follow-up single "Dinata Dinata" also reached the top ten and was certified gold. Their debut album, Mera Me Ti Mera, was released later that year, infusing Greek laïko music with Eurodance beats in a blend of both Greek and English lyrics. The album peaked at number 27 on the Swedish Albums Chart and spawned a further single, the title track. They released a self-titled EP of remixes of their first two hits in 2000.

In 2001 Antique competed and won the ticket to represent Greece in the Eurovision Song Contest 2001 with the song "(I Would) Die for You", which placed third in the final contest, Greece's highest result in contest history at the time. This brought them recognition in Greece, where they were mostly unknown, now signed to V2 Records. Their debut album was re-released there and was certified gold by the International Federation of the Phonographic Industry of Greece. Their second studio album, Die for You, was released in June 2001 in both Greece and Sweden, peaking at number 16 in the latter and being certified gold in Greece. The title track peaked at number three in Sweden and became their second gold-certified single there, while in Greece it topped the charts and was certified triple platinum, becoming one of the best-selling singles of all time. It charted within the top ten of Romania, Norway, and Europe and entered the charts of Denmark, Germany, and Switzerland. The other singles included "Ligo Ligo", which became the group's lowest-charting song in Sweden, and "Follow Me" which reached the top 20 in Sweden and Romania. Antique were awarded for shipments of 100 thousand records within the first year of their Greek career and were the best-selling group of the year. They won the Pop Corn Music Award for Best Group in 2002. They released a third album in December 2001 only in Greece, titled Me Logia Ellinika, a compilation of past remixes, videos, and new songs. Apart from "Follow Me (O,ti Theleis)", it included the laïko singles "Me Logia Ellinika" and "Kainourgia Agapi". It was re-released in 2002 with the content also released on the standalone EP Dance: Re-mixes + Videos.

Now based in Greece, Antique released their third studio album there, Alli Mia Fora (2002) which peaked at number four on the Greek Albums Chart and was certified gold. It spawned the singles "Moro Mou" and "Alli Mia Fora". A compilation of mostly past songs translated into English, Blue Love (2003), was released as their final studio album in Sweden. It topped the Greek International Albums Chart and became their highest-charting album in Sweden, at 13, while also charting in Finland. The singles were English versions of "Moro Mou", which tied their highest peak there at three, and "Time to Say Goodbye" ("Alli Mia Fora") reached the top 20 in Sweden and Romania. There was also a promotional single "Why?" featuring Bulgarian artist Slavi Trifonov, while the final single, "List of Lovers", failed to chart anywhere. Antique announced their disbandment in 2003 and a series of compilations were released beginning with the box set Collector's Edition (2003) in Greece, while The Very Best of Antique peaked at 47 in Sweden. Another Greek compilation Collection: Hits & Remixes was released in 2006.

In 2019, Antique made a reunion for one day only in Gothenburg performing their smash hits in We Who Love The 90's Festival.

In 2022, Antique returned as the representative of the music industry by covering Ti Ti hit song from Giorgos Alkaios which was a success in 1992. Antique are represented by Minos EMI in Greece and by Cosmos Music in Sweden.

Albums

Studio albums

Other albums

Extended plays

Compilation albums

Singles

Promotional singles

Other appearances

List of songs

Music videos

See also
Elena Paparizou discography

References

External links
Antique at MAD TV

Antique (band)
Discographies of Greek artists
Discographies of Swedish artists
Electronic music group discographies
Folk music discographies